Fleetwood Town Football Club is an English professional association football club based in the town of Fleetwood, Lancashire. Established in 1997, the current Fleetwood Town F.C. is the fourth incarnation of the club; it was originally formed in 1908. The team compete in League One, the third tier of the English football league system. Their home strip is red shirts with white sleeves and white shorts, their home ground is Highbury Stadium in Fleetwood and the supporters of the club are affectionately known as the Cod Army, which is also used as a nickname for the club alongside The Fishermen, the club's traditional nickname. They contest a rivalry with nearby Blackpool known as the Fylde Coast derby.

The original club founded in 1908 were known simply as Fleetwood and won the Lancashire Combination in the 1923–24 season, though would resign from the league in February 1928 due to financial difficulties. Fleetwood Windsor Villa took their place in the Lancashire Combination and won three Lancashire Combination Cups in 1933, 1934 and 1935. The club became founder members of the newly created Northern Premier League in 1968, though folded in 1976 and reformed the following year as Fleetwood Town. They initially competed in the Cheshire County League and then joined the North West Counties League in 1982. They were promoted as First Division champions in 1983–84 and reached the final of the FA Vase in the 1984–85 season. However, this incarnation of the club also folded in 1997.

The current incarnation of the club came into existence as Fleetwood Wanderers in 1997 and won the North West Counties League First Division title in 1998–99. They changed their name to Fleetwood Town in 2002 and were taken over by Andrew Pilley two years later, who would transform the club's fortunes with significant financial investments. Fleetwood won the North West Counties League Premier Division title in 2004–05, promotion out of the Northern Premier League First Division in 2005–06, the Northern Premier League Premier Division title in 2007–08 and the Conference North play-offs in 2010. Fleetwood won the Conference National title in 2011–12 to secure a place in the Football League for the first time. In May 2014, Fleetwood beat Burton Albion at Wembley in the League Two play-off final to gain promotion League One; the club's sixth promotion in ten years.

History

1908–1997: Early years and struggles

The current club was officially established in 1997 but, in three previous incarnations, the club's history dates back to 1908.

The original club, Fleetwood F.C., were champions of the Lancashire Combination in 1923–24. This club resigned from the Lancashire Combination in February 1928 because of financial difficulties.

In the 1928–29 season Fleetwood Windsor Villa F.C. were members of the Fylde and District Football League. At the end of that season they were elected to the West Lancashire Football League and were members for two seasons. They were then elected to the Lancashire Combination for season 1931–32, changing their name to Fleetwood F.C. They registered a hat-trick of Lancashire Combination Cup wins in 1932, 1933 and 1934. The side's goalkeeper in the first of those victories was Frank Swift, then only eighteen years old. After almost sixty years as a Lancashire Combination club, they became founder members of the newly created Northern Premier League in 1968. Great players of that era include Jack Ainscough and the late Percy Ronson, after whom one stand is named. The club finished in 10th place in its first season. As the NPL was one of several leagues immediately below Division Four of the Football League, this was effectively the fifth tier of English football, and the club would not surpass this success until 2010–11. Despite winning the Northern Premier League Cup in 1971, the club languished in the lower half of the table, finishing bottom for two successive seasons (1974–75 and 1975–76) before folding in 1976, again due to financial difficulties.

The club was re-established in 1977 as Fleetwood Town F.C., with many of the original personnel. Initially placed in Division One of the Cheshire League, it was moved in 1982 to the North West Counties League Division Two in its inaugural year, and promoted to Division One in 1984. The team reached the final of the FA Vase in 1985, losing 3–1 to Halesowen Town in front of a 16,000 crowd at Wembley. The club was placed in Division One (second tier) of the Northern Premier League when the league established a second tier in 1987, becoming the inaugural Division One Champions in 1988. In 1990–91 the club finished fourth in the NPL Premier Division, at the time effectively the sixth tier. However, by 1996, this third club had also folded due to financial issues.

1997–2011: Reform and promotions

Re-formed in 1997 as Fleetwood Wanderers F.C., the club was placed back in Division One of the North West Counties Football League (now the tenth tier of the English League system) and a sponsorship deal saw the club's name immediately changed to Fleetwood Freeport. The club was promoted to the Premier Division of the North West Counties League in 1999 and the name was reverted to Fleetwood Town in 2002. Tony Greenwood was appointed manager in 2003; soon afterwards, Andy Pilley took over as chairman. With his financial input, the club gained successive promotions as North West Counties League champions in 2005 and Northern Premier League First Division runners-up in 2006. This saw the club reach the Northern Premier League Premier Division.

Fleetwood Town won the Northern Premier League Challenge Cup in the 2006–07 season, beating Matlock Town 1–0, and finished the season just shy of the play-offs in eighth place with 67 points.

In the 2007–08 season Fleetwood won the Northern Premier League, gaining promotion to the Conference North. Along the way they set a new attendance record for the division, and were easily the best-supported team in the Premier Division.

Fleetwood started the 2008–09 Conference North season poorly; with the club at the bottom of the league, manager Tony Greenwood, along with his assistant, Nigel Greenwood and coach Andy Whittaker, were sacked. Greenwood was replaced by Micky Mellon, who also remained as Under-15 and Under-16 coach at Burnley. His position at Fleetwood was made full-time in January 2009, a first for the club. Fleetwood reached the Second Round Proper of the F.A. Cup for the first time in their history, but were beaten 3–2 by Hartlepool United at Highbury, in front of a then record crowd since the club's reformation of 3,280.

The demise of Farsley Celtic partway through the 2009–10 was detrimental to Fleetwood's campaign, as Farsley's entire 2009–10 playing record was expunged.  Fleetwood were chasing promotion along with local rivals Southport, and the ruling cost Fleetwood three points relative to Southport.  Fleetwood appealed against the decision but the appeal was rejected the day before the last match of the season, leaving Southport one point ahead.  Both teams won on the final day, giving Southport the championship.  Fleetwood instead had to contest the play-offs, and after beating Droylsden on penalties in the semi-final Fleetwood won promotion to the Football Conference by beating Alfreton Town 2–1 in the final.

For the 2010–11 season the club made all of its players full-time professionals, though this resulted in a few players leaving the club, including long serving club captain Jamie Milligan. The club spent most of the season in or near the play-off positions, eventually qualifying by finishing in fifth place.  In the play-off semi-finals, against Wimbledon, a new attendance record of 4,112 was set in the home leg, but Fleetwood lost both games with an 8–1 aggregate scoreline.

2011–present: Football League

Fleetwood's 2011–12 season was very successful. In the FA Cup, they reached the Third Round for the first time. After beating Mansfield Town, Wycombe Wanderers, and Yeovil Town, they were drawn at home to neighbours Blackpool, but lost 5–1 to the Championship club, with Jamie Vardy scoring Fleetwood's only goal in front of 5,094 supporters. In the league Fleetwood went on a 29-game unbeaten run, and were declared champions with two games remaining, giving them promotion to the Football League for the first time. At the end of the season Vardy moved to Leicester City for a fee of £1,000,000, which subsequently rose to £1,700,000 – a record transfer fee for a non-league club.

Fleetwood had a good start to the 2012–13 season, and had risen to third in the league after 10 games. However, they only won two of the next 10 games, slipping to sixth position; chairman Andy Pilley and manager Micky Mellon had a falling out after Mellon allegedly shown interest in the Burnley and Blackpool managerial vacancies.  On 1 December 2012, following a 3–2 defeat against Aldershot Town in the FA Cup, Mellon was sacked as manager of the League Two side. Former Preston North End and Burnley defender Graham Alexander was appointed as manager on 6 December 2012. Fleetwood were unbeaten for the next five games, and after a steady run of results had risen back to fourth place after 11 games under his command. However, Fleetwood only won two of the remaining 15 games, and consequently slipped down the table to finish 13th in League Two; this resulted in a large rebuilding of the squad.

The 2013–14 season was another successful one. Having been in and around the automatic promotion places all season and getting to the League Trophy area final, the club narrowly missed out on automatic promotion, finishing in fourth place. After beating York City 1–0 on aggregate in the play-off semi-final, Fleetwood beat Burton Albion 1–0 from an Antoni Sarcevic free-kick in the play-off final at Wembley on 26 May to win promotion to League One for the first time.

Playing at the club's highest level, the 2014–15 season was very successful. After three games the team was top at the league, and apart from a couple of occasions remained in the top half of the league for the entirety of the season, eventually finishing in a very creditable 10th place. Notable results were excellent away victories against Sheffield United and Rochdale and good home draws against Bristol City, Preston North End, Swindon Town, Sheffield United, Rochdale and Chesterfield. Also in 2014, the club purchased a 57-bedroom hotel in Blackpool for the youth team; the following year, the club started to move into its new training ground at Poolfoot Farm in nearby Thornton.

2015–16 was a difficult season. In July 2015, chairman Andy Pilley announced that the club's strategic direction would move more towards a self-sustaining model utilising the development and sell-on of homegrown talent to attempt to climb the league pyramid further rather than more expensive player signings. The playing budget was trimmed heavily. After a poor start to the season with only two wins in 10 league matches, Graham Alexander was sacked on 30 September 2015, with the club one point above the relegation zone after being beaten heavily 5–1 by Gillingham. On 6 October 2015 Steven Pressley was appointed manager. After a season flirting with the relegation zone, Pressley guided the club to safety, five points above the relegation zone, with 10 wins in 35 league matches and an appearance in the EFL Trophy Northern Area Final. On 20 April 2016, Sir Alex Ferguson officially opened the club's £8,000,000 Poolfoot Farm training ground complex, which has 12 grass pitches and 2 floodlit 4G artificial pitches, with a gym, cafe, bar, and offices.

Just before the start of the 2016–17 season, on 26 July 2016, Steven Pressley resigned from his position as manager. Uwe Rösler was appointed manager on 30 July 2016 and managed to guide the club to its highest ever finish of 4th place, but they were narrowly beaten 1–0 on aggregate by Bradford City in the play off semi-finals.

However, during the 2017–18 season Rösler was sacked on 17 February 2018 after seven successive defeats in all competitions and the club just outside the relegation zone on goal difference alone. On 22 February 2018, former Oldham Athletic manager John Sheridan was appointed on a short-term contract until the end of the season. He successfully guided the club away from relegation to finish mid table in 14th place.

At the beginning of the 2018–19 season Joey Barton was appointed as manager. He guided the club to an 11th-placed finish.

In 2019–20, the coronavirus pandemic (COVID-19) caused an early end to the regular season in March 2020. Teams that were in promotion play-off positions after points per game were applied entered the play-off matches in July 2020. Fleetwood Town were in 6th position and were unbeaten since losing to Burton Albion on 7 January 2020. However, they lost to Wycombe Wanderers 6–3 on aggregate in semi-final matches played behind closed doors.

The 2020–21 season was also overshadowed by coronavirus with matches played behind closed doors for the vast majority of fixtures. On 4 January 2021, Joey Barton was sacked as manager with Fleetwood in 10th place with chairman Andy Pilley describing the decision as "a tough one for me to make, but I felt now was the right time for the club to go in a different direction." Barton was replaced by Simon Grayson who guided Fleetwood to a 15th-place finish.

Highbury Stadium

The original 1908 club played on a pitch next to the North Euston Hotel, where the police station now stands. Apart from two years after the First World War – when the club played on a ground opposite from the Queen's Hotel on Poulton Road (Queen's Ground) – they remained at the North Euston Ground until moving to the present ground next to the Memorial Park in 1939.

In February 2007 the new all terraced Percy Ronson Stand was opened at a cost of £500,000. Originally stated to have a capacity of 1,240, this has since been revised downwards by Lancashire County Council to 621. In July 2007, further plans for the redevelopment of the stadium were announced, including three new stands. The plans were finalised in December 2007 and in March 2008, planning permission was given for the first phase – the construction of the north and west stands. Construction began in May 2008, and the two stands were opened for Fleetwood's first home game of the 2008–09 season, on 22 August 2008. The west stand, known as the Highbury Stand, has 550 seats together with disabled and press facilities and the north stand, known as the Memorial Stand, is a terraced stand with an official capacity of 1,473. A new Football League standard floodlight system and perimeter fencing were also installed.

The second phase development, the construction of a new East Stand, to bring the ground capacity over the 4,000 minimum required for Conference National football, was originally scheduled for the 2009 close season, but was postponed, and a £125,000 project to relay the pitch and improve drainage was instead implemented. Plans for the stand were revised and resubmitted in December 2009, and approved in March 2010. The capacity was increased to 2,000, increasing the overall ground capacity to over 5,000 and meeting the requirements of Football League membership. The stand had a proposed cost of £4,000,000. Construction began in May 2010, ahead of Fleetwood's successful Conference North play-off final against Alfreton Town. The stand, now named the Parkside Stand, was completed in the spring of 2011, and fully opened on 16 April for Fleetwood's game against Altrincham, which they won 3–1.

The stadium's current capacity is 5,327; it is the 112th largest stadium by capacity in England and the smallest in their division.

Rivalries
Although they have only met 13 times in a competitive fixture as of the end of the 2021–22 season, Fleetwood have a growing rivalry with Fylde Coast neighbours Blackpool who, followed by Morecambe and Preston North End, are the nearest Football League clubs to Fleetwood.
Fleetwood also have more traditional local rivalries against Morecambe, Southport and Barrow, all of whom have competed against Fleetwood fairly regularly when all four were non-league clubs. Other rivalries with nearby clubs have included those with Accrington Stanley, Chorley and Lancaster City.

According to a 2019 survey called 'The League of Love And Hate', Fleetwood supporters named Blackpool (83%), Morecambe (74%) and Accrington Stanley (62%) as their biggest rivals, with Preston North End (51%) and Wigan Athletic (47%) following. It may not be an entirely accurate representation, however, as the survey did not give the option of choosing non-league clubs, of whom some would more than likely feature.

Players

First-team squad

Development squad

Coaching staff

Sponsors
Fleetwood Town's main kit sponsors include Commercial Power Ltd and Business Energy Solutions.

Honours

League

Football League 
Football League Two
Play-off winners – 2013–14

Non-League 
Conference National
Champions – 2011–12
Conference North
Runners-up (and play-off winners) – 2009–10
Northern Premier League Premier Division
Champions – 2007–08
Northern Premier League First Division
Champions – 1987–88
Runners-up (promoted) – 2005–06
North West Counties Football League Premier Division
Champions – 2004–05
North West Counties Football League First Division
Champions – 1983–84, 1998–99
Lancashire Combination
Champions – 1923–24
Runners-up – 1933–34, 1934–35
Lancashire League West Division Reserve League
Winners – 2008–09

Cup

Non-League 
Northern Premier League Challenge Cup
Winners – 1971, 2007
Runners-up – 1989
Northern Premier League President's Cup
Winners – 1990
Runners-up – 1991
North West Counties Football League First Division Trophy
Winners – 1999
FA Vase
Runners-up – 1984–85
Lancashire Combination Cup
Winners – 1926, 1932, 1933, 1934
Runners-up – 1953, 1967
Peter Swales Memorial Shield
Winners – 2008

Records

Record victory: 13–0 vs. Oldham Town on 5 December 1998, North West Counties League Division Two
Record defeat: 0–9 vs. Bradford City on 26 November 1949, FA Cup First Round, 1949–50
Best league performance: 4th in Football League One (third tier) 2016–17
Best FA Cup performance: 5th Round – 2022–23
Best League Cup performance: 3rd Round – 2020–21
Best EFL Trophy performance: Northern Area Final – 2013–14, 2015–16
Best FA Trophy performance: 2nd Round – 2009–10
Best FA Vase performance: Runners–up – 1984–85
Transfer fee paid: £400,000 – Kyle Dempsey from Huddersfield Town May 2017
Transfer fee received: £1,700,000 – Jamie Vardy to Leicester City May 2012 (a record non-league sale)

Most appearances
498 – Nathan Pond (2003–2018)
421 – Jack Ainscough (1954–1966)
416 – Percy Ronson (1949–1964)

Most Football League appearances
209 - Alex Cairns

Record all-time goalscorer
367 – David Isbister

Record Football League goalscorer
43 – Paddy Madden

Most capped player
25 – Conor McLaughlin – Northern Ireland (2011–2017)

References

External links

Official website
Official Twitter account 
Fleetwood Town at BBC Sport
Fleetwood Town at Blackpool Gazette

 
Football clubs in England
National League (English football) clubs
Sport in the Borough of Wyre
Association football clubs established in 1908
1908 establishments in England
Football clubs in Lancashire
North West Counties Football League clubs
Northern Premier League clubs
English Football League clubs
Cheshire County League clubs